In the geometry of triangles, the Vecten points are two triangle centers associated with any triangle. They may be constructed by constructing three squares on the sides of the triangle, connecting each square centre by a line to the opposite triangle point, and finding the point where these three lines meet. The outer and inner Vecten points differ according to whether the squares are extended outward from the triangle sides, or inward.

The Vecten points are named after an early 19th-century French mathematician named Vecten, who taught mathematics with Gergonne in Nîmes and published a study of the figure of three squares on the sides of a triangle in 1817.

Outer Vecten point

Let ABC be any given plane triangle. On the sides BC, CA, AB of the triangle, construct outwardly drawn three squares  with centres  respectively. The point of concurrence is the outer Vecten point of the triangle ABC.

In Clark Kimberling's Encyclopedia of Triangle Centers, the outer Vecten point is denoted by X(485).

Inner Vecten point

Let ABC be any given plane triangle. On the sides BC, CA, AB of the triangle, construct inwardly  drawn three squares respectively with centres  respectively. The point of concurrence is the inner Vecten point of the triangle ABC.

In Clark Kimberling's Encyclopedia of Triangle Centers, the inner Vecten point is denoted by X(486).

The line  meets the Euler line at the Nine point center of the triangle . The Vecten points lie on the Kiepert hyperbola

See also
 Napoleon points, a pair of triangle centers constructed in an analogous way using equilateral triangles instead of squares

References

External links

Triangle centers